Egghead is an alias used by two supervillains appearing in American comic books published by Marvel Comics.

The Elihas Starr incarnation has made several animated appearances and was portrayed in live-action by Michael Cerveris in the Marvel Cinematic Universe film Ant-Man and the Wasp.

Publication history
The original version (Elihas Starr) first appeared in Tales to Astonish #38 (Dec. 1962), and was created by Stan Lee, Jack Kirby and Larry Lieber.

The second version first appeared in Dark Reign: Young Avengers #1 (July 2009), and was created by Paul Cornell and Mark Brooks.

Fictional character biography

Elihas Starr

Elihas Starr was born in Queens, New York. A gifted government research atomic scientist with an egg-shaped head, Starr was dismissed for espionage and resolved to use his intellect as a criminal mastermind. He was dealt a humiliating initial defeat by Ant-Man when he created a device to communicate with ants and tried to convince them to betray Ant-Man by leading into a flypaper trap. Ant-Man tricked him into thinking the ants had betrayed him before revealing that the ants were friends and would never turn against Ant-Man. Egghead later captured the Wasp to try luring his nemesis into a trap involving several creatures, including an iguana and an anteater, but this failed. Egghead divided his remaining years between attempted world conquest and seeking revenge on his nemesis, often hiding out in the Bowery section of Manhattan in between.

Egghead teamed up with the Mad Thinker and the Puppet Master in a plot to use a laser satellite to blackmail the United States government. He caused the death of Barney Barton, the brother of Hawkeye, who was aiding the Avengers, hired the Swordsman to kidnap Hank Pym, and battled Clint Barton again, who had at that time recently adopted the identity of Goliath.

Egghead later kidnapped his niece, Patricia "Trish" Starr, in order to test a device which allowed him to steal other people's intelligence, and wound up battling Pym as Ant-Man again. He would later cause her car to explode, causing her to lose an arm. He then formed the second Emissaries of Evil in an attempt to gain possession of the mystic ruby called the Star of Capistan. This team consisted of himself, the Rhino, Solarr and the Cobalt Man. Egghead and the Emissaries battled the Defenders. Egghead also fought Spider-Man on several occasions.

Egghead was still obsessed with Pym and engineered the man's disgrace. Egghead approached Pym (who was operating as Yellowjacket at the time) with a prosthetic arm that he wished to give to Trish in order make amends for his previous deeds. After the arm was installed, Egghead informed Pym that the arm contained a bomb that would be detonated unless Pym complied with Egghead's commands. Egghead had Pym attempt to rob a national treasury of adamantium, and Pym was caught and arrested by the Avengers. With Pym apparently out of the way, Egghead then formed the third Masters of Evil as part of a plot against the Avengers.

Egghead then sent his Masters of Evil to kidnap Pym from his own trial, making it appear as if Pym himself had staged a rescue. The attempt was successful and Egghead instructed Pym to construct an anti-aging device. Subsequently, Pym goaded Egghead into letting him test the machine himself. However, the device turned out to be a weapon system, and he single-handedly defeated the assembled Masters of Evil. The Avengers arrived too late to be of assistance, but Hawkeye arrived at the laboratory in time to see the defeated Egghead about to shoot Hank in the back out of spite with his energy blaster. Hawkeye shot an arrow into Egghead's gun barrel. The gun misfired, causing an accidental explosion of the energy blaster which killed Egghead instantly, with Hawkeye avenging the death of his brother Barney Barton at Egghead's hands years ago. Days later, his ashes were scattered by Pym and Trish in a private ceremony.

Arnim Zola later created a proto-husk of Egghead as part of his Corpse Corps. Deadpool fought and killed Egghead's proto-husk, who then had a small bird pop out of its skull.

A flashback in Fall of the Hulks: Alpha showed that Egghead was a member of the Intelligencia.

Egghead later turned up alive thanks to a "rejuvetech serum" that was used on him. He was behind the A.I.Vengers that he had computer technician Raz Malhotra activate after placing a neural override on the man. Egghead's activities attracted the attention of Pym in his alias of Giant-Man and Ant-Man. After breaking free of the neural override, Raz shuts down the A.I.Vengers, and Egghead is knocked out by Pym.

Egghead is later hired by Darren Cross to work for Cross Technological Enterprises. To help control Cross's Pym Particle-related abilities, Egghead provides the Yellowjacket armor for him to wear. Egghead later accompanies Cross and Crossfire into attacking Scott Lang's trial.

Robot
A robot version of Egghead appears as a member of the new Young Avengers. Although his original programming was "to respect all human life", the female neo-Nazi Big Zero (who seems to have a relationship with him) has reprogrammed him to hate several minorities.

Egghead is later recruited by the villain Zodiac (who was the benefactor of the Young Masters) to join his army.

In the pages of Avengers Undercover, Egghead is with the Young Masters when they are seen in Bagalia as members of the Masters of Evil.

During the "Iron Man 2020" event, Egghead was seen as a member of the A.I. Army.<ref>Iron Man 2020 vol. 2 #1. Marvel Comics.</ref>

Powers and abilities
Although he had no superhuman powers of his own, Eilhas Starr's genius level intellect made him a formidable foe. He was particularly skilled in the fields of robotics and engineering, and could absorb new ideas and knowledge at a seemingly superhuman rate. He had a degree in atomic science, and extensive knowledge in a wide variety of scientific and technological disciplines. Starr designed a wide variety of sophisticated weapons and technological paraphernalia.

As of Dark Reign: Young Avengers #1, the robot's powers have not been fully revealed. He has so far demonstrated the ability to fly and the power to phase his hand through a person's skull.

In other media
Television
 The Elihas Starr incarnation of Egghead appears in The Avengers: United They Stand episode "Egg-Stream Vengeance", voiced by Robert Cornell Latimer. This version is a rival of Hank Pym's
 The Elihas Starr incarnation of Egghead appears in The Super Hero Squad Show, voiced by Wayne Knight. This version is a member of Doctor Doom's Lethal Legion.
 The Elihas Starr incarnation of Egghead appears in Avengers Assemble, voiced by Yuri Lowenthal.
 The Elihas Starr incarnation of Egghead appears in the Ant-Man episode "Soup Time", voiced by Sam Riegel.

Film
 Elihas Starr appears in Avengers Confidential: Black Widow & Punisher, voiced by Hiroki Tōchi in the Japanese version and by Grant George in the English dub. 
 Elihas Starr appears during flashbacks depicted in the Marvel Cinematic Universe film Ant-Man and the Wasp, portrayed by Michael Cerveris. This version was a S.H.I.E.L.D. scientist and colleague of Hank Pym and Bill Foster. After being fired by the former, Starr stole technology to create a portal to the Quantum Realm to redeem his scientific reputation and brought his wife Catherine (portrayed by Riann Steele) and daughter Ava (portrayed by RaeLynn Bratten) with him for support. However, the portal malfunctioned, killing Elihas and Catherine in the resulting blast while Ava was afflicted with "molecular disequilibrium", which eventually led to her becoming the Ghost.

Video games
The Elihas Starr incarnation of Egghead appears as a playable character in Lego Marvel's Avengers.

Miscellaneous
The Elihas Starr incarnation of Egghead appears in the 2016 The Amazing Spider-Man comic strip by Stan Lee, Larry Lieber, and Alex Saviuk. This version married J. Jonah Jameson's estranged sister and inherited her share of the Daily Bugle'' upon her death.

References

External links
 Egghead (Elihas Starr) at Marvel.com
 Egghead (Elihas Starr) at Marvel Wiki
 Egghead (robot) at Marvel Wiki
 
 Egghead (Elihas Starr) Alphanex Entry on AlphaFlight.Net

Characters created by Jack Kirby
Characters created by Larry Lieber
Characters created by Stan Lee
Comics characters introduced in 1962
Fictional characters from Queens, New York
Fictional mad scientists
Marvel Comics male supervillains
Marvel Comics scientists
Marvel Comics supervillains